After the War is the sixth studio album by German gothic rock band Mono Inc. The album was released on August 17, 2012.

Track listing
 "My Worst Enemy"
 "No More Fear"
 "After the War"
 "Wave No Flag"
 "Arabia"
 "In the End"
 "From the Ashes" 
 "Grown"
 "My Songs Wear Black" 
 "Forever" 
 "The Long Way Home"

Personnel
Mono Inc.
 Martin Engler – lead vocals
 Carl Fornia – guitars
 Manuel Antoni – bass
 Katha Mia – drums, backing vocals

References

2012 albums
Mono Inc. albums